The LA900 series  is a crossover SUV-styled kei car produced by Japanese automaker Daihatsu. It is built on Daihatsu New Global Architecture (DNGA) platform and replaced the Cast Activa and Sport. It was first introduced at the 2020 Tokyo Auto Salon in January 2020 as a prototype vehicle and went on sale in June 2020.

Etymology 
The "Taft" nameplate was revived in 2020 after last being used on the Indonesian market F70 series Taft offroader in 2007. The name was originally used on the F10 series Taft.

For the LA900 model, the name Taft is an abbreviation for Tough & Almighty Fun Tool.

Concept model 
The Taft borrows its overall design from the WakuWaku concept car, which was one of four kei car concepts showcased at the 2019 Tokyo Motor Show. 

According to Daihatsu, the WakuWaku was designed to be a versatile combination of crossover SUV and recreational vehicle. The concept has four seats, with two folding rear seats, hidden rear doors, and a trunk located on the roof of the car behind the sunroof.

The three other concept vehicles shown alongside the WakuWaku were the TsumuTsumu commercial truck, WaiWai minivan, and IcoIco autonomous vehicle.

Sales

References

External links 

 

Taft (LA900)
Cars introduced in 2020
Kei sport utility vehicles
Crossover sport utility vehicles
Hatchbacks
Front-wheel-drive vehicles
All-wheel-drive vehicles
Vehicles with CVT transmission